Era Istrefi (born 4 July 1994) is a Kosovo-Albanian singer. Born and raised in Pristina, Istrefi  rose to significant international recognition with the breakthrough single "BonBon", which experienced commercial success worldwide and received various certifications. She later signed contracts with record labels Sony Music and Ultra Music. In 2018, Istrefi performed the official song for the 2018 FIFA World Cup, alongside Nicky Jam and Will Smith, at the closing ceremony of the grand final in Moscow. Her discography includes works in Albanian and English, among others "Shumë Pis", "Redrum", "Nuk E Di" and "Live It Up". Istrefi has received a number of awards and nominations, including the European Border Breakers Award and Top Music Award.

Life and career

1994–2014: Early life and success in the Albanian-speaking world 

Era Istrefi was born on 4 July 1994 into an ethnically Albanian family in the city of Pristina, then part of the FR Yugoslavia, present Kosovo. Her father Nezir Istrefi, a journalist, died in 2004. Istrefi's mother, Suzana Istrefi, a musician active between the 1980s and 1990s, took a break from her career upon her husband's death. Her older sister Nora Istrefi is also a singer.

In 2013, Istrefi made her debut in the Albanian-speaking world with the single "Mani Për Money", eventually releasing material sung in Gheg Albanian featuring English phrases. A few months later, she released a follow-up recording, "A Po Don?", which was promoted with a music video; it similarly achieved recognition. Her third single "E Dehun" was filmed in a Serbian desecrated Orthodox church. Upon its release, "E Dehun" assured Istrefi three Videofest Awards, including one for "Best New Artist". In December 2014, the singer made the pop ballad "13", which was produced in the United States, available for consumption. Its accompanying music video was viewed almost 200,000 times within 24 hours on YouTube, which later resulted in it being featured in V Magazine. She received Albanian citizenship in 2016.

2015–present: International breakthrough 

Istrefi experienced international  precognition with her single "BonBon", which was released on 30 December 2015 together with the music video shot in Brezovica, Kosovo. The song became an immediate success, becoming viral on social media. Additionally, the singer began gaining support from American actress Chloë Grace Moretz, and various publications referred to her as the "Rihanna and Sia of Kosovo". In February 2016, Istrefi signed to American labels Sony Music Entertainment and Ultra Music. It was reported that Istrefi will record her upcoming debut studio album in collaboration with RCA Records. In June 2016 an English version of "BonBon" was released.

On 24 February 2017, Istrefi released a new single, entitled "Redrum", which features producer Felix Snow. Few months later, on 29 September, Istrefi released another new single, entitled "No I Love Yous", which is in collaboration with French Montana.

She has started 2018 with a new single "Origami" featuring South African DJ Maphorisa. On 21 May it was announced that Istrefi had joined with American actor and rapper Will Smith and American singer Nicky Jam to release the Official FIFA World Cup Song on 25 May. She performed the song, entitled "Live It Up", alongside Smith and Jam on 15 July at the closing ceremony in the World Cup Final. During the rest of the summer she dropped two more singles, entitled "Prisoner" and "Oh God", the latter featuring Konshens. She was featured on Steve Aoki's album Neon Future III and Jonas Blue's album Blue, both released on 19 November.

In 2019, Istrefi collaborated with Belgian duo Dimitri Vegas & Like Mike on her follow-up single "Selfish" which topped the Billboard Dance Club Airplay chart. Two months later, she worked with her sister and Albanian singer Nora Istrefi on the single "Nuk E Di" which marked the first time that both artists have collaborated musically on a recording. In the same year, she released "Sayonara детка" with Russian rapper Элджей and was featured along American rapper Offset on the single "Let's Get Married" by Dutch duo Yellow Claw.

Artistry

Musical style 

Istrefi characterises her own music as multi genre combining dancehall with hip hop, pop and electronic. Her music also incorporates electronic dance, reggae, techno and alternative. Diverse observers have compared her music style and appearance to that of Rihanna and Sia.

Influences 

Era Istrefi takes influence from the different genres of music she discovered when she was young and stated that reggae and Jamaican music were the major type of music she fell in love when she was sixteen. She has named Rihanna and Lana Del Rey as her idols and biggest musical influences. A Kosovar Albanian musician Nexhmije Pagarusha from the late 20th century has also inspired the singer. Istrefi also praised Rihanna for having been able to constantly reinvent herself successfully throughout her career.

Controversies

"E Dehun" music video 

Istrefi received criticism from the Serbian Orthodox Church after the release of the music video for her third single "E Dehun". The video depicted a semi-nude woman dancing around the Church of Christ the Saviour in Pristina. The Serbian Orthodox Church called her actions "demonic" and "blasphemous". The video's director Astrit Ismaili responded by stating that they did not intend to offend Serbs and that he had the permission to shoot the video at the church entrance.

Discography

Awards and nominations

References 

1994 births
21st-century Albanian women singers
Albanian Internet celebrities
Albanian pop singers
Albanian reggae singers
Albanian songwriters
Kosovo Albanians
Kosovan singers
Living people
Musicians from Pristina
RCA Records artists
Sony Music artists
Ultra Records artists
Women in electronic music